The fourth season of The Bachelorette Australia premiered on Network 10 on 10 October 2018. The season features Ali Oetjen, a 32-year-old healthy lifestyle motivator from Adelaide, South Australia, courting 18 men. Oetjen previously appeared on the first season of The Bachelor Australia featuring Tim Robards, where she finished in third place and later appeared on the first season of Bachelor in Paradise Australia.

Contestants 
The season began with 18 contestants.

Call-Out Order

Color Key

	
 The contestant received the first impression "wild rose", having the ability to steal a single date from another contestant. 
 The contestant received a rose during a date.
 The contestant was eliminated outside the rose ceremony.
 The contestant was eliminated during a date.
 The contestant was eliminated.
 The contestant quit the competition. 
 The contestant won the competition.

Episodes

Episode 1
Original airdate: 10 October 2018

Episode 2
Original airdate: 11 October 2018

Episode 3
Original airdate: 17 October 2018

Episode 4
Original airdate: 18 October 2018

Episode 5
Original airdate 24 October 2018

Episode 6
Original airdate 25 October 2018

Episode 7
Original airdate 31 October 2018

Episode 8
Original airdate 1 November 2018

Episode 9
Original airdate 7 November 2018

Episode 10
Original airdate 8 November 2018

Episode 11
Original airdate 14 November 2018

Episode 12
Original airdate 15 November 2018

Ratings

References

2018 Australian television seasons
Australian (season 04)
Television shows filmed in Australia